Kingman Air Force Station (ADC ID: M-128) is a closed United States Air Force General Surveillance Radar station. It was closed in 1958.

Air Force units and assignments 
Units:
 659th Aircraft Control and Warning Squadron, Assigned 22 June 1955
 Activated at Norton AFB, California on 20 June 1953
 Inactivated on 15 August 1958

Assignments:
 27th Air Division, 22 June 1955 – 15 August 1958

See also
 List of USAF Aerospace Defense Command General Surveillance Radar Stations

References

  Cornett, Lloyd H. and Johnson, Mildred W., A Handbook of Aerospace Defense Organization  1946 - 1980,  Office of History, Aerospace Defense Center, Peterson AFB, CO (1980).
 Winkler, David F. & Webster, Julie L., Searching the Skies, The Legacy of the United States Cold War Defense Radar Program,  US Army Construction Engineering Research Laboratories, Champaign, IL (1997).
 Information for Kingman AFS, AZ

Installations of the United States Air Force in Arizona
Radar stations of the United States Air Force
Aerospace Defense Command military installations
1955 establishments in Arizona
1958 disestablishments in Arizona
Military installations established in 1955
Military installations closed in 1958